The Lewis and Clark State Historic Site opened in 2002 and is owned and operated by the Illinois Department of Natural Resources Division of Historic Preservation (formerly Illinois Historic Preservation Agency).  The site, located in Hartford, Illinois, commemorates Camp River Dubois, the camp of the Lewis and Clark Expedition from December 1803 to May 1804.  The site is National Trail Site #1 on the Lewis and Clark National Historic Trail and is located directly off the Confluence Bike Trail, part of the Confluence Greenway.  The site is at the southern end of the Meeting of the Great Rivers Scenic Route.

The Lewis and Clark State Historic Site is situated on the dry side of the Chain of Rocks Levee, approximately 1/4 mile from the Illinois shore of the Mississippi River.  It is also known as Lewis and Clark State Park.

Main attractions at the site include a  interpretive center and an outdoor replica of Camp River Dubois.  The interpretive center contains a theater, multiple hands-on exhibits and displays, and a  full-scale cutaway keelboat.

References

External links 

Lewis and Clark State Historic Site — official website

Lewis and Clark Expedition
Parks in Illinois
Protected areas on the Mississippi River
Illinois State Historic Sites
History museums in Illinois
Museums in Madison County, Illinois
Protected areas of Madison County, Illinois
2002 establishments in Illinois
Protected areas established in 2002
Museums established in 2002